Armstrong Williams (born February 5, 1962) is an American political commentator, entrepreneur, author, and talk show host. Williams writes a nationally syndicated conservative newspaper column, has hosted a daily radio show, and hosts a nationally syndicated television program called The Armstrong Williams Show. He is the owner of Howard Stirk Holdings, a media company affiliated with Sinclair Broadcasting that has purchased numerous television stations. Williams is a longtime associate of former HUD Secretary and 2016 presidential candidate Ben Carson.

Early life and career
One of ten children, Armstrong Williams was born on February 5, 1962, to Thelma Howard Williams and James Williams, in Marion, South Carolina. Williams was reared on the family's 200-acre tobacco farm. Graduating in 1981 from South Carolina State University, he received his BA in Political Science and English. He is a life member of Phi Beta Sigma fraternity.

Williams served as a confidential assistant to the chairman of the U.S. Equal Employment Opportunity Commission (Supreme Court Justice Clarence Thomas), a presidential appointee to the U.S. Department of Agriculture, and a legislative aide and advisor to U.S. Senator Strom Thurmond.

Williams is the cousin of South Carolina State Senator Clementa Pinckney, who was a victim of the Charleston church shooting.

Media career

Radio
In 1998, Williams united with The Salem Radio Network, which syndicated his national radio show to 26 of the top radio markets in the country. In 2002, he reunited with the Newark-based Talk America Radio Network. Williams joined the lineup at WWRL 1600 AM in March 2005 as co-host with Sam Greenfield on Drive Time Dialogue.

Williams began hosting a nightly talk show in 2008 on XM Satellite Radio Power 128 (now SiriusXM Urban View) called The Armstrong Williams Show. Williams's radio program featured his own opinions, values, and ideology related to political and current issues. In June 2018, it was announced that Williams was leaving radio to focus more on his television company.

Television
Williams was hired as a political analyst by Sinclair Broadcasting Group for its News Central program.

From 2002 to 2005, Williams hosted On Point with Armstrong Williams on cable network TVOne.

Williams hosts a syndicated television show called The Armstrong Williams Show. Previous shows hosted by Williams include The Right Side Forum and The Right Side with Armstrong Williams.

Syndicated column
Williams writes a syndicated column that is distributed by Creators Syndicate.

Howard Stirk Holdings

On November 25, 2013, Williams was involved in the purchase of two television stations as part of a larger $370 million acquisition of Barrington Broadcasting by Sinclair Broadcast Group. Howard Stirk Holdings, which Williams owns, was given ownership over NBC affiliate WEYI-TV in Flint–Saginaw–Bay City, Michigan, and CW affiliate WWMB in Myrtle Beach–Florence, South Carolina. The name of the company came from Williams's mother's middle name (Howard), and his father's middle name (Stirk). Both stations remain operated by Sinclair under a local marketing agreement, which resulted in allegations that the company was simply acting as a "sidecar" of Sinclair to skirt FCC ownership rules. Williams defended the allegations, noting that he had full control over the stations' programming and received the majority of their revenue.

On December 4, 2014, the FCC approved the transfer of station licenses for WMMP, Charleston, South Carolina, WCFT-TV, Tuscaloosa, Alabama, and WJSU-TV, Anniston, Alabama, from Sinclair to Howard Stirk Holdings. Under the arrangement, HSH would operate their future acquisitions as an independent broadcaster, forgoing agreements with third parties. On January 28, 2015, Intermountain West Communications Company filed to sell KVMY to Howard Stirk Holdings.  The transaction was finalized on October 30. Howard Stirk Holdings revealed in its January 2015 application to purchase Las Vegas station KVMY that it again planned to acquire the WLYH-TV license from Nexstar Broadcasting Group; that sale was completed on November 12, 2015. These transactions made Williams the largest African-American owner of television stations in the United States at the time. In 2019, Byron Allen surpassed Williams with his purchase of most of the assets of Heartland Media.

On April 24, 2018, Sinclair announced that as part of its merger with Tribune Media, Howard Stirk Holdings would acquire the Sinclair-owned KUNS-TV in Seattle and KMYU in St. George, Utah, as well as the Tribune-owned KAUT-TV in Oklahoma City. This transaction was canceled once the Tribune deal collapsed in August 2018.

Stations currently owned by Howard Stirk Holdings

1 Operated under a LMA by Sinclair Broadcast Group

'No Child Left Behind' controversy
In January 2005, USA Today reported that documents obtained under the Freedom of Information Act revealed that Williams had been paid $240,000 to promote the controversial No Child Left Behind Act. USA Today reported that Williams was hired "to promote the law on his nationally syndicated television show and to urge other black journalists to do the same." As part of the agreement, Williams was required "to regularly comment on NCLB during the course of his broadcasts", and to interview Education Secretary Rod Paige for TV and radio spots that aired during the show in 2004. The contract with Williams was part of a $950,000 contract between the U.S. Department of Education and the public relations company Ketchum Inc.

After the USA Today revelations, Tribune Media Services (TMS) terminated its syndication agreement with Williams. In a statement to Editor & Publisher (E&P), TMS stated: "[A]ccepting compensation in any form from an entity that serves as a subject of his weekly newspaper columns creates, at the very least, the appearance of a conflict of interest. Under these circumstances, readers may well ask themselves if the views expressed in his columns are his own, or whether they have been purchased by a third party." In response, Williams initially told E&P that he intended self-syndicate his column. E&P contacted 10 newspapers listed as clients on Williams's website to ask if they would continue to carry the column; the majority stated that they would not. Williams later told the Associated Press the following: "Even though I'm not a journalist—I'm a commentator—I feel I should be held to the media ethics standard. My judgment was not the best. I wouldn't do it again, and I learned from it."

On September 30, 2005, the Government Accountability Office released a report concluding that the Department of Education had acted illegally in making the payments because the government's role in the public relations effort was not disclosed.

Sexual harassment settlements
Williams has settled sexual harassment lawsuits, one in 1997 and another in 2017.

Political, business, and charitable activities
Williams is a longtime associate of HUD Secretary Ben Carson and was an influential surrogate during Carson's 2016 presidential campaign.

He is a national board member of the Carson Scholars Fund, a 501(c)(3) non-profit charitable organization.

In 2004, Williams was appointed by President George W. Bush to the President's Commission on White House Fellows, which chooses White House Fellows.

In 2021, Williams received an honorary doctorate degree from South Carolina State University.

Williams is also founder and CEO of the Graham Williams Group, an international marketing, advertising, and media public relations consulting firm.

See also
 Bush administration payment of columnists
 Black conservatism in the United States

Books by Williams
 Armstrong Williams, What Black and White America Must Do Now: A Prescription to Move Beyond Race, Hot Books, August 2020. 
 Armstrong Williams, Reawakening Virtues: Restoring What Makes America Great, New Chapter Publisher, July 2011, 
 Armstrong Williams, Letters to a young victim: Hope and Healing in America's Inner Cities, Scribner Paper Fiction, October 1996. 
 Armstrong Williams, Beyond Blame: How We Can Succeed by Breaking the Dependency Barrier'', Free Press, May 1995.

References

Further reading
 Thomas, Rhondda R. & Ashton, Susanna, eds. (2014). The South Carolina Roots of African American Thought. Columbia: University of South Carolina Press. "Armstrong Williams (b. 1959)", p. 359–366.

External links
 
 Howard Stirk Holdings

1962 births
Living people
African-American Christians
American columnists
American political writers
American male non-fiction writers
American talk radio hosts
Writers from New York City
People from Marion, South Carolina
South Carolina State University alumni
California Republicans
African-American radio personalities
The Washington Times people
Black conservatism in the United States
21st-century African-American people
20th-century African-American people